Lindsay Charles Sparks (born 5 December 1944) is a former New Zealand cricketer who played first-class and List A cricket for Central Districts and Auckland in the late 1960s and 1970s.

After several successful matches for Marlborough in the Hawke Cup, including seven wickets in the match in January 1968 in which Marlborough gained the Cup for the first time, Sparks made his first-class debut for Central Districts against the touring Indians in February 1968, taking 4/63 in what was nevertheless an innings defeat. He was to beat this return only once, when claiming 6/46 against Canterbury in January 1970.

Sparks' last two games in senior cricket were the only List A matches in which he appeared. In March 1971 he played against MCC at Fitzherbert Park in Palmerston North, taking the wicket of John Edrich. After a gap of more than six years, in November 1977 he made a solitary appearance for Auckland against Wellington in the Gillette Cup, and though Auckland won handsomely Sparks' own contribution was slight: his six overs went for 41 and he did not bat or take a catch.

See also 
 List of Auckland representative cricketers

References

Notes 
 
 

1944 births
Auckland cricketers
Central Districts cricketers
Living people
New Zealand cricketers
People from Waikari
Cricketers from Canterbury, New Zealand